Castanea pumila, commonly known as the Allegheny chinquapin, American chinquapin (from the Powhatan) or dwarf chestnut, is a species of chestnut native to the southeastern United States. The native range is from Maryland and extreme southern New Jersey and southeast Pennsylvania south to central Florida, west to eastern Texas, and north to southern Missouri and Kentucky. The plant's habitat is dry sandy and rocky uplands and ridges mixed with oak and hickory to 1000 m elevation. It grows best on well-drained soils in full sun or partial shade.

Description
It is a spreading shrub or small tree, reaching  in height at maturity. The bark is red- or gray-brown and slightly furrowed into scaly plates. The leaves are simple, alternately arranged, narrowly elliptical or lanceolate, yellow-green above and paler and finely hairy on the underside. The flowers are monoecious and appear in early summer. The fruit is a golden-colored cupule  in diameter with many sharp spines, maturing in autumn. Each cupule contains one ovoid shiny dark brown nut that is edible.

A natural hybrid of Castanea pumila and Castanea dentata has been named Castanea × neglecta.

Habitat

Allegheny chinquapin occurs in mixed hardwood forests among pine and oak trees on high ridges and slopes that are free from limestone. It grows on black sandy dunes in the Carolinas, but not on frontal dunes. It is also found on well-drained stream terraces, dry pinelands, and disturbed sites such as railroad rights- of-way, power line clearings, fence and hedgerows, pine plantations, and old fields. Allegheny chinquapin is closely related to the American chestnut, Castanea dentata, and both trees can be found in the same habitat. Allegheny chinquapin can be distinguished by its smaller nut (half the size of a chestnut) that is not flattened (chestnuts are flattened on one side). The leaves of the Allegheny chinquapin are smaller than the American chestnut and have less distinct teeth. Allegheny chinquapin, however, is less susceptible to the chestnut blight fungus that devastated the American chestnut. While the chinquapin does blight to some degree, it continues to send out suckers that will produce fruit. Chinquapins are quite vulnerable nevertheless, and there are many reports of heavily diseased and cankered trees.

Uses
John Smith of Jamestown made the first record of the tree and its nuts in 1612, observing its use by the Native Americans. Native Americans made an infusion of chinquapin leaves to relieve headaches and fevers. The bark, leaves, wood, and seed husks of the plant contain tannin. The nuts can be blanched, dried, and rehydrated to be prepared as food. The wood is hard and durable and is sometimes used in fences and fuel, but the plant is too small for the wood to be of commercial importance.

Chinquapins are used in landscapes for the purpose of attracting wildlife. When the base of plant is cut or wounded at ground level the plant will grow multiple stalks producing a thick cover used by turkeys. The nuts are consumed by squirrels and rabbits while white tail deer graze upon the foliage.

References

Further reading
 Chinkapin: Potential New Crop for the South

External links
 VT Dendrology – includes pictures of leaves, flowers, and fruit

pumila
Trees of the United States
Edible nuts and seeds
Plants used in traditional Native American medicine
Taxa named by Philip Miller